The 40th Artillery Brigade is an artillery formation of the Ukrainian Ground Forces, based in Pervomaisk. The unit was activated on 25 May 2015.

On 23 August 2020, the Brigade was awarded the honorific "Lithuanian Grand Duke Vytautas the Great".

During the 2022 Russian invasion of Ukraine, the brigade was rendered the recently established honorary award of "For Courage and Bravery" by Ukrainian president Volodymyr Zelenskyy for its service in defense of Kharkiv.

Current Structure 
As of 2017 the brigade's structure is as follows:

 40th Artillery Brigade, Pervomaisk
 Headquarters & Headquarters Battery
 1st Howitzer Artillery Battalion (2A36 Hyacinth-B)
 2nd Howitzer Artillery Battalion (2A36 Hyacinth-B)
 3rd Howitzer Artillery Battalion (2A65 Msta-B)
 4th Howitzer Artillery Battalion (2A65 Msta-B)
 5th Anti-tank Artillery Battalion (MT-12 Rapira)
 Artillery Reconnaissance Battalion
 19th Motorized Infantry Battalion "Dnipro-2"
 Engineer Company
 Maintenance Company
 Logistic Company
 CBRN-defense Platoon

References

External links

 The Official Facebook page of the 40th Artillery Brigade

Artillery brigades of Ukraine
Military units and formations established in 2015